Wisliceny is a Slavic surname. Notable people with the surname include:

 Dieter Wisliceny (1911–1948), German SS officer and perpetrator of the Holocaust executed for war crimes
 Günther-Eberhardt Wisliceny (1912–1985), German SS officer

Slavic-language surnames